D. Bruce Poole (born June 17, 1959) is the former Chairman of the Maryland Democratic Party. He was formerly a member of the Maryland House of Delegates representing District 2B, which covers Washington County, Maryland.

Poole was first elected to office in 1986 when he defeated Republican Ronald J. Stansbury for the seat in District 3A. In 1990, he captured 95% of the vote to maintain his seat. In 1994, Poole narrowly won reelection by defeating Republican Richard D. Wiles by 66 votes. He was defeated in 1998 by Republican Christopher Shank.

Early life and education
Poole was born and raised in Washington County. He attended North Hagerstown High School. In 1981, he received his B.A. from Washington and Lee University in Lexington, Virginia. He briefly attended the University of Melbourne before getting his J.D. from Washington and Lee in 1985.

Career
Poole was admitted to the Maryland Bar in 1985 and served as a trial lawyer for several years. He was the Secretary of the Washington County Bar Association in 1986 and served as the first president of the United Democratic Club of Washington County.

In 1981, Poole was the recipient of the Rotary International Graduate Fellowship. He was the co-author of the Best Brief in Nation, Jessup International Moot Court Competition in 1984.

Poole is a partner in the Hagerstown, Maryland personal injury, family law and business law firm The Poole Law Group.

Following the 2014 elections in Maryland where the Democrats lost the governor's mansion, Poole was elected Chair of the Maryland Democratic Party, succeeding Yvette Lewis.

On March 1, 2017, after serving two years as Chair of the Maryland Democratic Party, Poole was succeeded by former news anchor and congressional candidate Kathleen Matthews.

Election results

1998 Race for Maryland House of Delegates – District 2B
Voters to choose one:
{| class="wikitable"
|-
!Name
!Votes
!Percent
!Outcome
|-
|-
|Christopher B. Shank, Rep.
|4,873
|  51%
|   Won
|-
|-
|D. Bruce Poole
|4,626
|  49%
|   Lost
|-
|}

1994 Race for Maryland House of Delegates – District 2B
Voters to choose one:
{| class="wikitable"
|-
!Name
!Votes
!Percent
!Outcome
|-
|-
|D. Bruce Poole, Dem.
|4,219
|  50%
|   Won
|-
|-
|Richard D. Wiles
|4,143
|  50%
|   Lost
|-
|}

References

External links
 

Living people
1959 births
Members of the Maryland House of Delegates
Politicians from Hagerstown, Maryland
People from Washington County, Maryland
Washington and Lee University alumni
Maryland Democratic Party chairs